Sir John Henry Lefroy  (28 January 1817 – 11 April 1890) was an English military man and later colonial administrator who also distinguished himself with his scientific studies of the Earth's magnetism.

Biography 
Lefroy was a son of the Rev. John Henry George Lefroy, of Ewshot House (subsequently Itchel) in Hampshire, England, and his wife, Sophia Cottrell. His sister Anne married the Irish landowner and politician John McClintock, who was created the 1st Baron Rathdonnell in 1868. Lefroy was also a first cousin to Thomas Lefroy (1776-1869), the future Chief Justice of Ireland whom Jane Austen apparently had in mind when she created the character of Mr. Darcy in 'Pride and Prejudice'.  Lefroy entered the Royal Military Academy, Woolwich in London in 1831 and became a 2nd lieutenant of the Royal Artillery in 1834. When the British government launched a project under the direction of Edward Sabine to study terrestrial magnetism, he was chosen to set up and supervise the observatory on Saint Helena. He embarked on 25 September 1839, for Saint Helena, and carried out his task throughout the following year. In 1842, Lefroy was sent to Toronto as the superintendent of the new Toronto Magnetic and Meteorological Observatory built there as part of that project. He immediately began planning a field expedition to the Canadian northwest to measure magnetism there. With an assistant and a Hudson's Bay Company brigade, he travelled more than 5,000 miles in the Northwest from May 1843 to November 1844, taking measurements at over 300 stations in an attempt to map the geo-magnetic activity of British North America from Montreal to the Arctic Circle, and locate the North Magnetic Pole. They followed the Mackenzie River as far as Fort Good Hope and visited Fort Simpson in the west. On 9 June 1848, Lefroy was made a member of the Royal Society.

Lefroy remained in Toronto until 1853, continuing his observations and managing the observatory. On 16 April 1846, he married his first wife Emily Mary, a daughter of Sir John Robinson, 1st Baronet, of Toronto; they had two daughters and two sons. Lefroy also helped found the Royal Canadian Institute, where he was the first vice-president in 1851/52 and then president in 1852/53. Before his return to London, he managed the transfer of the Toronto Magnetic and Meteorological Observatory to the provincial government.

Upon his return to London in April 1853, Lefroy held various office positions in the British Army. He became involved in the army reform, and in that function corresponded from 1855 to 1868 with Florence Nightingale. During the Crimean War he began the negotiations that would eventually see the Dardanelles Gun being gifted to Britain.  Later, he became Inspector General of army schools and finally in 1868 director of the Ordnance Office. In 1859 his wife died, and on 12 September the following year he married his second wife Charlotte Anna née Dundas (widow of Col. Armine Mountain). When he retired from the army in 1870 with the honorary rank of Major General, he entered the Colonial Service (now the Foreign and Commonwealth Office and was appointed Governor of Bermuda from 1871 to 1877. He left this position due to illness and returned to England, but later served as Administrator of Tasmania from 21 October 1880 to 7 December 1881.

John Henry Lefroy was made a Companion of the Order of the Bath (CB) in 1870, and knighted in 1877 (KCMG).

Legacy 
A small town in Ontario, Lefroy, situated on the south end of Lake Simcoe was named after John Henry Lefroy.  

Mount Lefroy in the Rocky Mountains named after John Henry Lefroy, although it appears unclear if James Hector of the Palliser Expedition named it in 1858, or if the name is due to George Mercer Dawson, 1884.

The painting Scene in the Northwest: Portrait of John Henry Lefroy by Paul Kane showing John Henry Lefroy, which had been in possession of the Lefroy family in England, garnered a record price at an auction at Sotheby's in Toronto on 25 February 2002, when Canadian billionaire Kenneth Thomson won the bid at C$5,062,500 including fees (US$3,172,567.50 at the time). Thomson subsequently donated the painting as part of his Thomson Collection to the Art Gallery of Ontario.

In 1960, the Ontario Heritage Foundation, Ministry of Citizenship and Culture erected a Provincial Military Plaque dedicated to Sir John Lefroy (1817–1890) on the University of Toronto campus.

Selected publications 
Lefroy, J. H.: Magnetical and meteorological observations at Lake Athabasca and Fort Simpson by Captain J.H. Lefroy and at Fort Confidence in Great Bear Lake by Sir John Richardson; London: Longman, Brown, Green and Longmans, 1855.
Lefroy, J. H.: Diary of a magnetic survey of a portion of the Dominion of Canada, chiefly in the North-Western Territories, executed in the years 1842–1844; London: Longmans, Green & Co., 1883.

References

External links 
 Biography at the Dictionary of Canadian Biography Online URL last accessed 11 January 2006.
 Lefroy and the Bermudas. URL last accessed 11 January 2006.
 Mount Lefroy. URL last accessed 11 January 2006.
 Royal Society memberships. URL last accessed 11 January 2006.
 Maine Antique Digest, May 2002 on the auction of the Kane painting.
Ontario Plaques – Sir John Henry Lefroy 1817–1890

Further reading 
Lefroy, J.H. In Search of the Magnetic North: A Soldier- Surveyor's Letters from the North-west, 1843–1955, edited by George F.G. Stanley, The MacMillan Company of Canada Limited, 1955.
Lefroy, Autobiography of General Sir J.H. Lefroy published posthumously by his second wife "for private circulation only", London: Pardon and Sons Ltd, 1895, of which an excerpt is available online.
Loffroy of Cambray, A Supplement, London: Privately printed by Ebenezer and Son, Ltd., 1961.
Lefroy, J.H.  Memorials of the Discovery and Early Settlement of the Bermuda or Somer Islands, 1515–1685, compiled from the colonial records and other original sources., The Bermuda Historical Society, the Bermuda national Trust, 1981.

1817 births
1890 deaths
Royal Artillery officers
British Army lieutenant generals
British scientists
Companions of the Order of the Bath
Fellows of the Royal Society
Knights Commander of the Order of St Michael and St George
Governors of Tasmania
Governors of Bermuda
Graduates of the Royal Military Academy, Woolwich
Colony of Tasmania people